Schools with the name Holy Family College:

Holy Family College (Wisconsin), United States
Holy Family University, United States (historically known as Holy Family College)
Holy Family College, Abak, Nigeria
Holy Family College, Sydenham, South Africa

See also
Holy Family (disambiguation)